The 1896 United States presidential election in Michigan took place on November 3, 1896. All contemporary 45 states were part of the 1896 United States presidential election. Voters chose 14 electors to the Electoral College, which selected the president and vice president.

Background
Ever since the formation of the Republican party, Michigan had been a Republican-leaning state due to the Lower Peninsula’s strong history of settlement by anti-slavery Yankees, who after the end of Reconstruction continued to see the need for solid Republican voting to oppose the solidly Democratic Confederate and Border States. During the Third Party System, heavily Catholic and immigrant-settled Southeast Michigan would lean towards the Democratic Party, which was opposed to the moralistic pietism of Yankee Republicans.

In the 1892 election, aided by favorable demographic changes and a legislative change allocating electors by congressional district, the Democratic Party managed to carry five of Michigan’s fourteen electoral votes, and also elect a Governor and a majority to the state legislature. However, the Panic of 1893 turned expectations or hopes of Michigan becoming a swing state rudely on its head, especially when incumbent President Cleveland stood firm, sending in troops to break the Pullman Strike. In the 1894 elections, only one Democrat maintained a seat in the state legislature, a loss of seventy seats compared to the 1890 elections.

In the wake of this decline, Cleveland decided not to run for a third term, and endorsed the National Democratic Party ticket of John M. Palmer. The Populist Party seized control of the Democratic Party and nominated former Nebraska Representative William Jennings Bryan.

Vote
During his campaign, Bryan travelled through Michigan in the latter stages of his October Midwestern tour. Polls late in that month, covering all but three of Michigan’s counties, showed Republican candidate William McKinley ahead of Bryan by almost three-to-one, which was an increase upon his margin in earlier polls. Another poll a little later was also certain Michigan would vote for McKinley.

Michigan ultimately voted for McKinley by a margin of 10.29 points, a much smaller margin that earlier polls, although a reduction was expected as some unpolled rural areas of the state had been believed to favour Bryan’s free silver policy. His margin was an increase of five points upon what Benjamin Harrison had achieved over the state as a whole in 1892, though there were large variations. In the traditionally Democratic German Catholic areas, there was a large shift to McKinley due to Archbishop Ireland’s opposition to free silver, In the heavily Methodist cabinet counties of Michiana, by contrast, Bryan gained substantially and was the first Democratic presidential candidate to carry Branch County, Calhoun County, Eaton County and Isabella County since Franklin Pierce in 1852.

Results

Results by county

See also
 United States presidential elections in Michigan

Notes

References

Michigan
1896
1896 Michigan elections